David Chang (born August 5, 1977) is an American restaurateur, author, podcaster, and television personality. He is the founder of the Momofuku restaurant group. In 2009, Momofuku Ko was awarded two Michelin stars, which the restaurant has retained each year since. He co-founded the influential food magazine Lucky Peach in 2011 which lasted for 25 quarterly volumes into 2017. In 2018, Chang created, produced, and starred in a Netflix original series called Ugly Delicious, and through his Majordomo Media group, he has produced and/or starred in more television and podcasts. On November 29, 2020, he became the first celebrity to win the $1,000,000 top prize for his charity, Southern Smoke Foundation, and the fourteenth overall million dollar winner on Who Wants to Be a Millionaire.

Early life and education 
Chang was born in Arlington, Virginia, the son of Korean parents, mother Woo Chung Hi "Sherri," who was born in Kaesong, and Chang Jin Pil, later Joseph P. Chang, who was born in Pyongyang. Chang grew up in Arlington, with two older brothers and one sister. Chang's parents emigrated from Korea as adults in the 1960s. As a child, Chang was a competitive golfer who participated in a number of junior tournaments. Chang attended Georgetown Prep and then Trinity College, where he majored in religious studies. After graduating from college, Chang pursued a variety of jobs, including teaching English in Japan, then bussing tables and holding finance positions in New York City.

On a 2022 episode of the TV series Finding Your Roots, it was revealed that one of Chang's paternal ancestors was Jang Bogo, a famous mariner and military leader of the Medieval Korean kingdom of Silla.

Culinary training and career

Chang started attending the French Culinary Institute (FCI)—now known as the International Culinary Center—in New York City in 2000. While he was training, he also worked part-time at Mercer Kitchen in Manhattan and got a job answering phones at Tom Colicchio's Craft restaurant. Chang stayed at Craft for two years and then moved back to Japan to work at a small soba shop, followed by a restaurant in Tokyo's Park Hyatt Hotel. Upon returning to the U.S., Chang worked at Café Boulud, where his idol, Alex Lee, had worked. But Chang soon grew "completely dissatisfied with the whole fine dining scene".

In 2004, Chang opened his first restaurant, Momofuku Noodle Bar in the East Village. Chang's website states momofuku means "lucky peach", but the restaurant also shares a name with Momofuku Ando—the inventor of instant noodles.

In August 2006, Chang's second restaurant, Momofuku Ssäm Bar, opened a few blocks away. The Infatuation rated it a high 8.4/10, calling the menu "inventive, exciting, and different." In March 2008, Chang opened Momofuku Ko, a 12-seat restaurant that takes reservations ten days in advance, online only, on a first-come-first-served basis. Later that year, Chang expanded Momofuku Ssäm Bar into an adjacent space with his colleague Christina Tosi, whom he had hired to run Momofuku's pastry program. They named the new space Momofuku Milk Bar, serving soft serve, along with cookies, pies, cakes and other treats, many of these inspired by foods Tosi had as a child.

In May 2009, it was reported that Momofuku Milk Bar's Crack Pie, Cereal Milk, and Compost Cookies were in the process of being trademarked. In October 2009, Chang and former New York Times food writer Peter Meehan published Momofuku, a highly anticipated cookbook containing detailed recipes from Chang's restaurants. In May 2010, Chang opened Má Pêche in midtown Manhattan.

In November 2010, Chang announced the opening of his first restaurant outside the US in Sydney, Australia. Momofuku Seiōbo opened in October 2011 at the redeveloped Star City Casino in Southern-hemisphere. In an article with the Sydney Morning Herald, Chang was quoted as saying: "I've just fallen in love with Australia. I'm just fascinated by the food scene in Sydney and Melbourne. People are excited about food in Australia. It's fresh and it's energetic." The restaurant was awarded three hats from the Sydney Morning Herald Good Food Guide in its first year and was named Best New Restaurant.

In March 2011, Chang announced that he would be bringing Momofuku to Toronto, and opened it in late 2012. The restaurant is located in a three-story glass cube in the heart of downtown Toronto. Momofuku Toronto is made up of three restaurants, Noodle Bar, Daishō and Shōtō, as well as a bar, Nikai. Daishō and Shōtō closed in late 2017, and the space was refurbished. A new Momofuku restaurant, Kojin, opened in the space in 2018.

Chang launched Fuku, a chain of fast food restaurants specializing in fried chicken sandwiches, in June 2015. In 2016, Chang launched his first digital-only restaurant, which offers a menu only for delivery in Midtown East and takes orders taken via an app named Ando. Later in 2016, Chang participated in a project hosted by a Silicon Valley startup named Impossible Foods. He prepared food that was later added on the menu of one of his restaurants, Momofuku Nishi, as a partnership between Impossible Foods and David Chang.

In July 2017, Chang announced the opening of his first West Coast restaurant in Los Angeles. The restaurant, Majordomo, opened in January 2018.
 In May 2017, Chang announced the opening of a new restaurant at the Hudson Yards development in New York. In June 2018, Má Pêche closed after operating for 8 years.

On December 30, 2019, Chang opened the 250-seat Majordomo Meat & Fish restaurant in The Palazzo tower of The Venetian Las Vegas. In March 2020, in response to the COVID-19 pandemic, Momofuku restaurant group made the decision to temporarily close its restaurants. Later that year, they decided to consolidate some restaurants, and permanently close Momofuku Nishi in Manhattan's Chelsea neighborhood, and Momofuku CCDC in Washington, D.C. In 2021 they also closed Momofuku Seiōbo in Sydney.
Chang's Majordomo and Moon Palace closed at Palazzo on June 6, 2022.

Media career

Television 
In 2010, he appeared in the fifth episode of HBO's Treme alongside fellow chefs Tom Colicchio, Eric Ripert and Wylie Dufresne.  His presence on the show was expanded in the second season when one of the characters, a New Orleans chef who has moved to New York City, takes a job in his restaurant. Chang has also served as a guest judge on the reality show Top Chef: All Stars. In 2011, he was a guest judge on MasterChef Australia. Chang hosted the first season of the PBS food series The Mind of a Chef, which was executive produced by Anthony Bourdain and premiered in the fall of 2012. In September 2013, David appeared on a skit on the Deltron 3030 album, Event 2. In 2016, he guest starred as himself in the IFC series Documentary Now! episode "Juan Likes Rice & Chicken", a parody of Jiro Dreams of Sushi. In 2018, Chang created, produced, and starred in a Netflix original series, Ugly Delicious. Chang also appeared in two episodes of the BuzzFeed web series Worth It, and another Netflix series The Chef Show, produced by his friends Roy Choi and Jon Favreau. In 2019, he produced a Netflix original titled "Breakfast, Lunch & Dinner" with guest stars including Seth Rogen and Kate McKinnon. He also appeared in the Blue's Clues & You! episode "Welcome to Blue's Bistro" in the Mailtime segment. He hosted the documentary film series The Next Thing You Eat.

Writing 
 
In summer 2011, David Chang released the first issue of his Lucky Peach food magazine, a quarterly publication created with Peter Meehan and published by McSweeney's. The theme of Issue 1 was Ramen. Contributors included Anthony Bourdain, Wylie Dufresne, Ruth Reichl, and Harold McGee. The theme of Issue 2 is The Sweet Spot, and Issue 2 reached #3 on the New York Times bestsellers list. Contributors to Issue 2 include Bourdain, Harold McGee, Momofuku Milk Bar's Christina Tosi, Daniel Patterson and Russell Chatham. Issue 3: Chefs and Cooks, was released on March 13 and was also a New York Times bestseller. Each subsequent issue continued to focus on a particular theme.

Lucky Peach discontinued after 25 issues in 2017.

Podcast 
He has his own show on the Ringer podcast network (The Dave Chang Show). He also is a host on a spin off called The Recipe Club with guest host Chris Ying.

Public persona 
Epicurious described Chang as having a "bad-boy attitude" for having no reservations or vegetarian options. Chang created a controversy in 2009 by making dismissive remarks about California chefs, telling Anthony Bourdain "They don't manipulate food, they just put figs on a plate."

David Chang serves on the Food Council at City Harvest and the Culinary Council at Food Bank for New York City, two hunger-relief organizations. He is also a member of the board of trustees at MOFAD, the Museum of Food and Drink in New York City.

Publications

David Chang; Chris Ying; Peter Meehan (2011-05-2017). Lucky Peach.
David Chang; Gabe Ulla (2020-09-08). Eat a Peach.

Restaurants

Momofuku 
 2004: Momofuku Noodle Bar (New York, NY)
 2006: Momofuku Ssäm Bar (New York, NY)
 Booker and Dax – located in Ssäm Bar (New York, NY)
 2008: Momofuku Ko (New York, NY)
 2010: Má Pêche – located in Chambers Hotel (New York, NY)
 2011: Momofuku Seiōbo – located in The Star (Sydney, Australia)
 2012/closed 2022: Momofuku (Toronto, Canada) – includes Momofuku Noodle Bar, Nikai, Daishō and Shōtō
 Noodle Bar (Toronto, Canada)
 Nikai (Toronto, Canada)
 Daishō (Toronto, Canada) 
 Shōtō (Toronto, Canada)
 2015: Momofuku CCDC (Washington, DC)
 2016: Momofuku Nishi (New York, NY)
 2017: Momofuku Las Vegas (Las Vegas, NV)
 2018: Majordōmo (Los Angeles, CA)

Fuku 
 2015: Fuku – East Village (New York, NY)
 2015: Fuku+ – Midtown; located in Chambers Hotel (New York, NY)
 2017: Fuku – Financial District (New York, NY)
 Fuku – Battery Park City (New York, NY)
 Fuku – Madison Square Garden (New York, NY)
 Fuku – Citi Field (Queens, NY)
 Fuku – Hard Rock Stadium (Miami Gardens, FL)
 Fuku - Hudson Yards (New York, NY)
 Fuku - Chancery Market (Wilmington, DE)

Milk Bar 
 2008: Momofuku Milk Bar – East Village (New York, NY)
 Momofuku Milk Bar – Midtown (New York, NY)
 Momofuku Milk Bar – Williamsburg (Brooklyn, NY)
 Momofuku Milk Bar – Upper West Side (New York, NY)
 Momofuku Milk Bar – Carroll Gardens (Brooklyn, NY)
 2012: Milk Bar (Toronto, Canada)
 2015: Milk Bar (Washington, DC)
 2017: Milk Bar (Las Vegas, NV)
 2018: Milk Bar (Los Angeles, CA) 
 2019: Milk Bar & Pizza (Cambridge, MA)

Moon Palace 
 2020: Moon Palace (Las Vegas, NV)

Awards

James Beard Foundation Awards 
 2006 James Beard Rising Star Chef of the Year Nomination
 2007 James Beard Rising Star Chef of the Year
 2008 James Beard Best Chef New York City for Momofuku Ssäm Bar
 2009 James Beard Best New Restaurant for Momofuku Ko
 2010 Momofuku – Cookbook Nomination
 2012 James Beard Outstanding Chef (nominated)
 2013 James Beard Outstanding Chef
 2014 James Beard Foundation Who's Who in Food and Beverage in America

The S. Pellegrino World's 50 Best Restaurants
 The S. Pellegrino World's 50 Best Restaurants: Momofuku Ko – #65 (2011)
 The S. Pellegrino World's 50 Best Restaurants: Momofuku Ssäm Bar – #37 (2012)
 The S. Pellegrino World's 50 Best Restaurants: Momofuku Ko – #79 (2012)
 The S. Pellegrino World's 50 Best Restaurants: Momofuku Ssäm Bar– #86 (2013)
 The S. Pellegrino World's 50 Best Restaurants: Momofuku Ssäm Bar- #64 (2014)

Michelin
 Ko : 2 Michelin Stars for 2009, 2010, 2011, 2012, 2013, 2014, 2015
 2011, 2012, 2013, 2014 Michelin Guide: Momofuku Ssäm Bar and Momofuku Noodle Bar, Michelin Bib Gourmands Guide to NYC

The Sydney Morning Herald Good Food Guide
  Momofuku Seiōbo – Three Hats (2013)
 Momofuku Seiōbo – Best New Restaurant (2013)

Additional awards and accolades
 2013 Momofuku Seiōbo, Restaurant of the Year
 2013 Momofuku Shōtō and Daishō, The Best New Toronto Restaurants
 2012 Momofuku, The Most Important Restaurant in America
 2012 Momofuku Ko, Five Most Influential Restaurants of the Past Six Years
 2012 Momofuku Seiōbo, Time Out Restaurant of the Year
 White Guide (March 2012) – Global Gastronomy Award 2012
 Crain's New York (March 2011) – 40 Under 40
 2010 Time 100 Most Influential People
 Food & Wine 2006 Best New Chef
 Bon Appetit 2007 Chef of the Year
 GQ 2007 Chef of the Year

See also
 East Asian cuisine
 Korean Americans in New York City
 Television chef

References

External links

 Momofuku
 
 

1977 births
Living people
American drink industry businesspeople
American cookbook writers
American male non-fiction writers
American people of North Korean descent
American people of South Korean descent
American restaurateurs
American television chefs
American male chefs
Businesspeople from Virginia
International Culinary Center alumni
People from Vienna, Virginia
Trinity College (Connecticut) alumni
Writers from Virginia
Georgetown Preparatory School alumni
James Beard Foundation Award winners
Chefs from Virginia
Chefs from New York City
American podcasters
Asian American chefs
Netflix people
American gastronomes